The Senate of the Republic of Chile is the upper house of Chile's bicameral National Congress, as established in the current Constitution of Chile.

Composition
According to the present Constitution of Chile, the Senate is composed of forty-three directly elected senators, chosen by universal popular suffrage vote in 16 senatorial circumscriptions. These serve eight-year terms, with half of them being replaced every fourth year.  They must be eligible to vote, have completed secondary school, or its equivalent, and be at least 35 years old.

The Senate meets at the new National Congress building located in the port city of Valparaíso that replaced the old National Congress building located in downtown Santiago, the nation's capital.

Abolition of the unelected
Amendments to the Constitution, approved by a joint session of Congress on August 16, 2005, eliminated non-directly elected senators from March 11, 2006, the day 20 newly elected senators were sworn in, leaving the total number of senators at 38, all directly elected. Previously, according to the Constitution of 1980, "designated" or "institutional" senators were appointed to the chamber. Two former heads of state, Eduardo Frei Ruiz-Tagle and Augusto Pinochet, were installed as senators for life. Pinochet later resigned from this position and Frei lost his seat in the 2005 reform. However, Frei remained in the Senate by winning an elective seat.

Historical evolution
The Senate of Chile was created in 1812 to support the formulations of policies of the Government Junta. Since then it has undergone several constitutional reorganizations that have altered the scope of its constitutional powers, its composition and the generation of its members.

First senate
Created by Article 7 of the Provisional Constitutional Manual of 1812. It was composed of seven titular members (one for each province) and three alternate members and was supposed to serve as a counterbalance to the executive power of the Government Junta. The senators were directly nominated by the provinces in agreement with the central government.  It functioned from November, 1812 to January, 1814, when it was reorganized to better respond to the problems caused by the successive military defeats at the hands of the advancing Spanish Army.

Consultive senate
Created by Article 13 of the Provisional Government Manual of 1814. As its predecessor, it was composed of seven titular members (only) nominated by the provinces in lists of three from which they were selected by the Supreme Director.  It functioned from March to July, 1814, when the Spanish Army captured Santiago, putting an end to the Patria Vieja government.

First conservative senate
Created by Title III of the Constitution of 1818. It was composed of five titular members and five alternate members selected directly by the Supreme Director.  It was supposed to function only when the lower house was not in function or could not meet, and had the power to enact "provisory rules" that had the same effect as laws (hence the "conservative" moniker, because it "conserved" the power.) It functioned from October, 1818 to May, 1822.

Election cycles
Key to Senate classes by regions:
Class 1 consists of:
-the 23 current senators whose terms expire in March 2026.

Class 2 consists of:
-the 20 current senators whose terms expires March 2022. Plus 7 new senators, who were elected in the 2021 general elections.

Current composition Senate of Chile

See also
President of the Senate of Chile
National Congress of Chile
Chamber of Deputies of Chile
Politics of Chile
List of legislatures by country

Notes

External links
 Senate of Chile Official web site
 Article from the Economist dealing with the Senate composition

Chile
Government of Chile